Robert Arnold (died circa 1408) was an English politician who was MP for Winchelsea in January 1377 and 1393. He was also mayor of Winchelsea and deputy butler for Winchelsea and Rye.

References

14th-century English politicians
Mayors of Winchelsea
British butlers
English MPs January 1377
English MPs 1393
People from Winchelsea